WRYC (92.5 FM) is a radio station licensed to serve the community of Frisco City, Alabama. The station is owned by Damon L. Collins, through licensee Blackbelt Broadcasting, Inc. It airs a country music format.

The station was assigned the WRYC call letters by the Federal Communications Commission on November 22, 2016.

References

External links
 

RYC
Radio stations established in 2017
2017 establishments in Alabama
Country radio stations in the United States
Monroe County, Alabama